Gregory Stephen Jerman (born January 24, 1979) is a former American football offensive lineman.  He played four seasons in the National Football League for the Miami Dolphins from 2002 to 2004 and for the Buffalo Bills in 2005.  He played college football at Baylor University from 1998 to 2001. He was born in 1979 at Hyannis, Massachusetts, and attended Franklin High School in El Paso, Texas. He was admitted to the Texas State Bar in 2014 and began practicing law with the Lubbock County Criminal District Attorney's office.

References

American football offensive tackles
Baylor Bears football players
Buffalo Bills players
Miami Dolphins players
1979 births
Living people
People from Hyannis, Massachusetts
Sportspeople from Barnstable County, Massachusetts